Romancing the Stone is a 1984 action-adventure romantic comedy film directed by Robert Zemeckis, written by Diane Thomas and produced by Michael Douglas, who also starred in the film alongside co-stars Kathleen Turner and Danny DeVito. The film follows a romance novelist who must venture beyond her New York City comfort zone to Colombia in order to save her sister from criminals who are holding her for ransom as they search for a priceless treasure.

Thomas wrote the screenplay in 1979, as the only one in her lifetime. Zemeckis, who at the time was developing Cocoon, liked Thomas's screenplay and offered to direct but 20th Century Fox initially declined, citing the commercial failure of his first two films I Wanna Hold Your Hand and Used Cars. Zemeckis was eventually dismissed from Cocoon after an early screening of Romancing the Stone failed to further impress studio executives. Alan Silvestri, who would collaborate with Zemeckis on his later films, composed the score.

Romancing the Stone was released on March 30, 1984, to positive reviews from critics and earned over $115 million worldwide at the box office. A sequel, The Jewel of the Nile, was released in December 1985.

Plot
Joan Wilder is a successful, but lonely, romance novelist in New York City. After finishing her latest novel, Joan leaves her apartment to meet her editor, Gloria. On the way she is handed a letter by her neighbor, Mrs. Irwin, that contains a map, sent by her recently murdered brother-in-law, Eduardo. While she is gone, a man tries to break into her apartment and is discovered by her apartment supervisor, whom he kills. Returning to her apartment, Joan finds it ransacked. She then receives a frantic phone call from her sister Elaine, Eduardo's widow. Elaine has been kidnapped by antiquities smugglers, cousins Ira and Ralph, and instructs Joan to go to the Colombian coastal city of Cartagena with the map she received; it is Elaine's ransom.

Flying to Colombia, Joan is diverted from the rendezvous point by Colonel Zolo—the same man that ransacked her apartment looking for the map—by tricking her into boarding the wrong bus. Instead of heading to Cartagena, this bus goes deep into the interior of the country. Ralph realizes this and begins following Joan. After Joan accidentally distracts the bus driver by asking where they are going, the bus crashes into a Land Rover, wrecking both vehicles. As the rest of the passengers walk away, Joan is menaced by Zolo but is saved by the Land Rover's owner, an American exotic bird smuggler named Jack T. Colton. For getting her out of the jungle and to a telephone, Joan promises to pay Jack $375 in traveler's cheques.

Jack and Joan travel the jungle while eluding Zolo and his military police. Reaching a small village, they encounter a drug lord named Juan, who is a big fan of Joan's novels and happily helps them escape from Zolo.

After a night of dancing and passion in a nearby town, Jack suggests to Joan that they find the treasure themselves before handing over the map. Zolo's men enter the town, so Jack and Joan steal a car to escape—but it is Ralph's car, and he is sleeping in the back. They follow the clues and retrieve the treasure, an enormous emerald called El Corazón ("The Heart"). Ralph takes the emerald from them at gunpoint, but Zolo's forces appear, distracting Ralph long enough for Jack to steal the jewel back. After being chased into a river and over a waterfall, Jack and Joan are separated on opposite sides of the raging river; Joan has the map, but Jack has the emerald. Jack directs Joan to Cartagena, promising that he will meet her there.

In Cartagena, Joan meets with Ira, who takes the map and releases Elaine. But Zolo and his men arrive, with a captured Jack and a severely beaten Ralph. As Zolo tortures Joan, Jack tries to throw the emerald into a crocodile pool behind Zolo. Zolo is able to catch the emerald, but then a crocodile jumps up and bites his hand off, swallowing the emerald with it. A shootout ensues between Zolo's soldiers and Ira's gang. Joan and Elaine dash for safety, pursued by the maimed Zolo, as Jack tries to stop the crocodile from escaping. He begrudgingly releases it, to          instead try to save Joan.

A crazed Zolo charges at Joan; she dodges his wild knife slashes and he falls into a crocodile pit. As the authorities arrive, Ira and his men escape, but Ralph is left behind. After a kiss, Jack dives into the water after the crocodile with the emerald, leaving Joan behind with her sister.

Later, Joan is back in New York City, and has written a new novel based on her adventure. Gloria—Joan's publisher—is moved to tears by the story and tells Joan she has another best-seller on her hands. Returning home, she finds Jack waiting for her in a sailboat named the Angelina, after the heroine of Joan's novels, and wearing boots made from the crocodile's skin. He jokes that the crocodile got "a fatal case of indigestion" from the emerald, which he sold, using the money to buy the boat of his dreams. They go off together, planning to sail around the world.

Cast

 Michael Douglas as Jack T. Colton – A brash, rugged American bird hunter living in Colombia who assists Joan in her adventure. He hopes to save up for a sailboat and leave Colombia so he can travel the world.
 Kathleen Turner as Joan Wilder – A successful but lonely romance novelist from New York City. She longs to meet and fall in love with a man resembling the heroic male characters from her own writing.
 Danny DeVito as Ralph – An antiquities smuggler from Queens who takes Joan's sister hostage and pursues Colton and Wilder through the jungle in hopes of acquiring the map.
 Zack Norman as Ira – Ralph's cousin and partner in crime. He has an affinity for crocodiles.
 Alfonso Arau as Juan – "The Bellmaker", a man implied to be a drug smuggler who happens to be a huge fan of Joan's work. He helps Colton and Wilder in their escape from Zolo's forces.
 Manuel Ojeda as Colonel Zolo – Elaine's husband's killer and Deputy Commander of the secret police. After failing to obtain the map from Joan in New York, he follows her to Colombia in pursuit.
 Holland Taylor as Gloria Horne – Joan's friend and publisher.
 Mary Ellen Trainor as Elaine Wilder
 Eve Smith as Mrs. Irwin
 Joe Nesnow as Super
 José Chávez as Santos
 Evita Muñoz as Hefty Woman
 Camillo García as Bus Driver
 Rodrigo Puebla as Bad Hombre
 Paco Morayta as Hotel Clerk
 Kymberly Herrin as Angelina
 Bill Burton as Jesse Gerrard
 Ted White as Grogan
 Eve Smith as Mrs. Irwin

Production

Screenplay
The screenplay was written five years earlier by a Malibu waitress named Diane Thomas in what would end up being her only screenplay made into a movie. She died in a car crash a year and a half after the film's release.

Casting
Sylvester Stallone was originally considered for the role of Jack T. Colton. Other leads considered include Burt Reynolds, Clint Eastwood, Paul Newman, and Christopher Reeve for the part of Jack Colton and Debra Winger as Joan Wilder.

Filming
Filming locations included Veracruz, Mexico (Fort of San Juan de Ulúa), Huasca de Ocampo, Mexico, and Snow Canyon, Utah. The scene where Turner and Douglas get separated on opposite banks on a whitewater river was filmed on the Rio Antigua near the town of Jalcomulco, Veracruz.

Turner later said of the film's production, "I remember terrible arguments [with Robert Zemeckis] doing Romancing. He's a film-school grad, fascinated by cameras and effects. I never felt that he knew what I was having to do to adjust my acting to some of his damn cameras – sometimes he puts you in ridiculous postures. I'd say, 'This is not helping me! This is not the way I like to work, thank you! Zemeckis would go on to work with Turner again, casting her as the voice of Jessica Rabbit in 1988's Who Framed Roger Rabbit.

Reception

Box office
Studio insiders expected Romancing the Stone to flop to the point that, after viewing a rough cut of the film, the producers of the then-under-development Cocoon fired Zemeckis as director of that film. However, it became a surprise hit and 20th Century Fox's only big hit of 1984. The film eventually grossed over US$115 million worldwide, becoming the sixth-highest-grossing film of 1984. Zemeckis later stated that the success of Romancing the Stone allowed him to make Back to the Future (1985).

Critical
Romancing the Stone holds an 86% approval rating on the review aggregation website Rotten Tomatoes, based on 56 reviews. The website's critical consensus reads, "Romancing the Stone reaches back to the classic Saturday morning serials of old with an action-filled adventure enlivened by the sparkling chemistry between its well-matched leads."

Upon the release of Romancing the Stone, Time magazine called the film "a distaff Raiders rip-off". The Washington Post remarked that "Though fitfully thrilling and amusing, [Joan Wilder's] adventures degenerate into a muddle. Neither screenwriter Diane Thomas nor director Robert Zemeckis, good-humored as they strive to be, maintains a coherent perception of how the plot should be contrived to trump the heroine's overactive fantasy life." They elaborated that the stone makes an uncompelling MacGuffin, Joan's character development is incongruous and ultimately unsatisfying, and Joan and Jack lack romantic chemistry. By contrast, Time Out commented that "The script is sharp and funny, the direction sure-footed on both the comedy and action fronts", and compared the film favorably to its contemporary in the same genre, Indiana Jones and the Temple of Doom (1984). Roger Ebert called it "a silly, high-spirited chase picture", saying he greatly enjoyed the film's imaginative perils, colorful cast of villains, and believable relationship between its two lead characters. He likewise compared it favorably to other Raiders of the Lost Ark clones.

Colin Greenland reviewed Romancing the Stone for Imagine magazine, and stated that "Good-humoured, sparky stuff in the manner of Raiders of the Lost Ark."

Filmsite.org included it as one of the best films of 1984, and Entertainment Weekly included it on its list of films that made 1984 one of the best years for Hollywood films.

Then-U.S. President Ronald Reagan viewed the film at Camp David in May 1984.

Awards
Award wins:
 Golden Globe Award for Best Motion Picture – Musical or Comedy
 Golden Globe Award for Best Actress – Musical or Comedy – Kathleen Turner
 Los Angeles Film Critics Association Award for Best Actress – Kathleen Turner
 Golden Reel Award for Best Sound Editing – ADR
 Stuntman Award for Most Spectacular Stunt – Vince Deadrick Jr., Terry Leonard

Award nominations:
 Academy Award for Best Film Editing – Donn Cambern, Frank Morriss
 American Cinema Editors Award for Best Edited Feature Film – Donn Cambern, Frank Morriss
 Writers Guild of America Award for Best Original Screenplay – Diane Thomas

In other media

Books
The novelization of Romancing the Stone was credited to Joan Wilder, although (along with a novelization of the sequel movie, The Jewel of the Nile) it was actually written by Catherine Lanigan.

Sequels
The success of Romancing the Stone led to a sequel, The Jewel of the Nile, without Zemeckis directing but with Douglas, Turner, and DeVito all returning. The film was released in December 1985 and was commercially successful, but received weaker reviews than the first film.

Since 1985, numerous attempts have been made to produce further sequels to the film. Another sequel, called The Crimson Eagle, would have had Jack and Joan take their two teenage children to Thailand where they are blackmailed into stealing a priceless statue. Filming was scheduled to begin in 1987, following Michael Douglas's shooting of Wall Street, but the production was delayed and ultimately never made it past the development stage. DeVito reunited Douglas, Turner, and himself in his 1989 film The War of the Roses.

In 2005 and again in 2008, Douglas was developing a second sequel, tentatively titled Racing the Monsoon.

Since 2007, 20th Century Fox has considered producing a remake of Romancing the Stone, with the possibility of a reboot series. The roles of Jack Colton and Joan Wilder would be filled by Taylor Kitsch (or Gerard Butler) and Katherine Heigl, respectively. By 2011, the remake was re-worked as a television series.

See also
 High Risk (1981)
 Green Ice (1981)
 The Jewel of the Nile (1985)
 Florida Straits (1986)
 The Lost City (2022)

References

Bibliography

 Eliot, Marc. Michael Douglas: A Biography. New York: Three Rivers Press, 2013. .
 Leigh, Mark. Epic Fail: The Ultimate Book of Blunders. London: Virgin Books, 2014. .
 Solomon, Aubrey. Twentieth Century-Fox: A Corporate and Financial History (The Scarecrow Filmmakers Series). Lanham, Maryland: Scarecrow Press, 1988. .
 Turner, Kathleen. Send Yourself Roses: Thoughts on My Life, Love, and Leading Roles. New York: Springboard Press, 2008. .

External links
 
 
 

1984 films
1984 romantic comedy films
1980s adventure comedy films
1980s action adventure films
American action adventure films
American adventure comedy films
American romantic comedy films
1980s English-language films
Films about writers
Films set in Colombia
Films set in New York City
Films shot in Mexico
Treasure hunt films
Jungle adventure films
Films shot in Utah
Best Musical or Comedy Picture Golden Globe winners
Films featuring a Best Musical or Comedy Actress Golden Globe winning performance
20th Century Fox films
Estudios Churubusco films
Films directed by Robert Zemeckis
Films produced by Michael Douglas
Films scored by Alan Silvestri
1980s American films
1980s Mexican films